Hands is a surname. Notable people with the surname include:

 Alice Hands, co-founder of the architectural firm Gannon and Hands in 1894
 Bill Hands (1940–2017), American baseball player 
 Greg Hands (born 1965), British Conservative Party politician
 Guy Hands (born 1959), English financier and investor
 Israel Hands, 18th-century pirate
 Jaylen Hands (born 1999), American basketball player
 Ken Hands (1926–2017), Australian footballer and coach
 Kenneth Hands (1892–1954), South African cricketer
 Marina Hands (born 1975), French stage and film actress
 Philip Hands (1890–1951), South African cricketer
 Reginald Hands (1888–1918), South African cricketer
 Terry Hands (1941–2020), English theatre director

See also
 Mr. Hands (disambiguation)
 Hand (surname)